Tyrese Campbell (born 28 December 1999) is an English professional footballer who plays as a forward for Stoke City.

Early life
Campbell was born in Cheadle Hulme, Greater Manchester and attended the private Cheadle Hulme School. His father Kevin, is a former professional footballer who played for Arsenal, Everton, Nottingham Forest and West Bromwich Albion.

Career
Campbell began his career with Manchester City's Academy before turning down the chance to turn professional with the club in the summer of 2016. He instead signed a contract with Stoke City with a fee of £1.75 million being set at a tribunal.  Campbell was a prolific goalscorer with Stoke under-18s in 2016–17 as he helped them reach the FA Youth Cup semi-final. Campbell was promoted to train with the first team in February 2018 after impressing manager Paul Lambert in training.

Campbell made his professional debut on 24 February 2018 in a 1–1 draw at Leicester City in the Premier League. He made a further three substitute appearances towards the end of the 2017–18 season  as Stoke suffered relegation to the EFL Championship. Campbell made his first start for Stoke on 15 January 2019 in a FA Cup match against Shrewsbury Town, scoring twice in a 3–2 defeat.

On 31 January 2019, he was loaned to Shrewsbury for the remainder of the EFL League One season. He made his debut two days later in a 3–0 home loss to Luton Town, in which he started and was substituted for Stefan Payne after 63 minutes. He scored his first league goal on 16 February, opening a 1–1 home draw with Burton Albion. Campbell played 15 times for the Shrews, scoring five goals helping them to secure League One safety. Campbell's performances for Shrewsbury earned him the EFL Young Player of the Month award for February 2019.

Campbell scored his first Championship goal on 19 October 2019 in a 2–0 win against Fulham. Campbell struggled to make an impact under Nathan Jones being mainly used as a substitute. Following the arrival of Michael O'Neill in November 2019, Campbell eventually worked his way back into the side and scored vital goals against Sheffield Wednesday, Huddersfield Town and West Bromwich Albion helping Stoke move out the relegation zone at the turn of the new year. Campbell signed a new four-and-a-half-year contract with Stoke on 24 January 2020, after turning down offers from a number of other clubs. The season extended into June due to the COVID-19 pandemic and Campbell played in all the remaining matches and scored twice against relegation rivals Barnsley on 4 July 2020. He ended the campaign with nine goals from 37 appearances as Stoke avoided relegation and finished in 15th position.

Campbell began the 2020–21 season in good form, scoring the winning goal against Brentford on 24 October 2020, and scoring twice in a 4–3 victory against Huddersfield Town on 21 November. By the beginning of December, he had scored seven goals and provided five assists in 19 appearances. However, he suffered a season-ending knee injury against Cardiff City on 8 December. Campbell was out for ten months, returning against Bournemouth on 19 October 2022. He struggled to regain his form in 2021–22, scoring five goals in 30 appearances.

International career
Having previously represented England at U16 and U17 level, Campbell received his first call-up for the U20 squad on 8 November 2019. Campbell scored twice in a 4–0 victory over Portugal in the U20 Elite League on 14 November 2019.

Career statistics

References

External links
 

English footballers
1999 births
Living people
Stoke City F.C. players
Shrewsbury Town F.C. players
Premier League players
English Football League players
People from Cheadle Hulme
People educated at Cheadle Hulme School
Association football forwards
Black British sportspeople
Footballers from Greater Manchester
English people of Jamaican descent